Manasa Saulo, (born 6 April 1989) is a Fiji professional Rugby union footballer. Saulo was selected to the Fijian National squad for the first time 2012 and has gone on to play in two Rugby World Cups. Saulo plays at Tighthead Prop currently for Major League Rugby side Rugby ATL having previously played for London Irish, RC Toulounnais and Timisoara Saracens.

References

External links
 

1989 births
Living people
Fijian rugby union players
Fiji international rugby union players
SCM Rugby Timișoara players
RC Toulonnais players
London Irish players
Rugby ATL players
Fijian Drua players
Expatriate rugby union players in Romania
Expatriate rugby union players in France
Expatriate rugby union players in England
Fijian expatriate sportspeople in Romania
Fijian expatriate sportspeople in France
Fijian expatriate sportspeople in England
Fijian expatriate rugby union players
Sportspeople from Suva
Rugby union props
Soyaux Angoulême XV Charente players